The Louisiana Purchase Historic State Park, located in eastern Arkansas, commemorates the initial point from which the lands acquired through the Louisiana Purchase were subsequently surveyed. The park encompasses  of forested wetlands, a landform which is regionally in decline due to agricultural development practices that include draining such areas. On the survey point is a  marker erected in 1926 by the L'Anguille Chapter of the Daughters of the American Revolution It was listed on the National Register of Historic Places and designated as a National Historic Landmark.

Description
The historic state park is located at the eastern end of Highway 362, southeast of Blackton, Arkansas, at the tripoint junction of Lee, Monroe, and Phillips counties. It is a  parcel of swamp, or forested wetlands, which is remarkably unchanged from the time when surveyors came here in 1815. This type of wetlands is becoming increasingly rare because of the practice of draining and clearing such land for agricultural use.

The inscription reads: 
"This stone marks the base established November 10, 1815, from which the lands of the Louisiana Purchase were surveyed by United States engineers. The first survey from this point was made to satisfy the claims of the soldiers of the War of 1812 with land bounties".

History
On April 30, 1803, negotiators for the United States and the First French Empire, signed the Louisiana Purchase agreement, by which the United States acquired  of land west of the Mississippi River, doubling its size. President Thomas Jefferson commissioned the Lewis and Clark Expedition, which traveled west along the Missouri and associated rivers, eventually reaching the Pacific Coast, from 1804 to 1806.

President James Monroe ordered a survey of the territory in 1815, in order to permit the orderly award of land in the territory to military veterans of the War of 1812. Prospect K. Robbins and Joseph C. Brown were commissioned to identify a starting point for the survey work in what is now eastern Arkansas. The team led by Robbins traveled north from the mouth of the Arkansas River, while that of Brown traveled west from the mouth of the St. Francis River. On October 27, 1815, Robbins' party crossed the east–west line laid down by Brown's party at this point, formally establishing the Fifth Principal Meridian. The  of land Robbins traversed is even today some of the most difficult terrain in the state to negotiate. Brown's party traversed  of land alternately described as "good for farming" and containing "briers and thickets in abundance". Brown's party eventually surveyed as far west as present-day Little Rock, while Robbins continued north to the Missouri River. Two trees near the site were blazed to mark the meeting point of the two survey lines.

Although survey work based on this point continued in subsequent years, covering most of Arkansas, Missouri, Minnesota, Iowa, and North and South Dakota, the initial point was forgotten. It was rediscovered in 1921 by surveyors working the line between Phillips and Lee counties, who found the blazed trees. The Marianna, Arkansas chapter of the Daughters of the American Revolution began a campaign to memorialize the spot, culminating in the placement of the stone marker and a dedication ceremony on October 27, 1926, the 111th anniversary of the point's establishment.

Arkansas designated the area as a state park in 1961, but appropriated no funds for land purchases or development. The Arkansas Natural Heritage Commission, recognizing the swamp's natural significance, provided funds to purchase the 37.5 acres which now make up the park. The Commission holds a conservation easement on the property to limit development.

Gallery

See also
List of Arkansas state parks
List of National Historic Landmarks in Arkansas
National Register of Historic Places listings in Lee County, Arkansas
National Register of Historic Places listings in Monroe County, Arkansas
National Register of Historic Places listings in Phillips County, Arkansas

References

External links

Louisiana Purchase State Park at Encyclopedia of Arkansas History & Culture

1961 establishments in Arkansas
Aftermath of the War of 1812 in the United States
Daughters of the American Revolution
Historic surveying landmarks in the United States
Landmarks of the War of 1812
Louisiana Purchase
Monuments and memorials on the National Register of Historic Places in Arkansas
National Historic Landmarks in Arkansas
National Register of Historic Places in Lee County, Arkansas
National Register of Historic Places in Monroe County, Arkansas
National Register of Historic Places in Phillips County, Arkansas
Protected areas established in 1961
Protected areas of Lee County, Arkansas
Protected areas of Monroe County, Arkansas
Protected areas of Phillips County, Arkansas
State parks of Arkansas